Sam Jones (born February 21, 1996) is an American football center who is a free agent. He played college football at Arizona State and was named a team captain as a redshirt junior.

Professional career

Denver Broncos
Jones was drafted by the Denver Broncos in the sixth round (183rd overall) of the 2018 NFL Draft. Jones was released on August 31, 2019, as part of final roster cuts.

Arizona Cardinals
On September 2, 2019, Jones was signed to the Arizona Cardinals practice squad. He signed a reserve/future contract with the Cardinals on December 30, 2019.

On September 4, 2020, Jones was waived by the Cardinals.

Indianapolis Colts 
On December 30, 2020, Jones was signed to the Indianapolis Colts practice squad. On January 10, 2021, Jones signed a reserve/futures contract with the Colts. On May 12, 2021, Jones was waived by the Colts.

Atlanta Falcons
Jones was claimed off waivers by the Atlanta Falcons on May 13, 2021. He was waived on August 31, 2021 and re-signed to the practice squad the next day. He was released on September 7, 2021.

New York Giants
On September 29, 2021, Jones was signed to the New York Giants practice squad. He was released on October 5.

References

External links
 Arizona State Sun Devils football bio

1996 births
Living people
American football offensive guards
Arizona Cardinals players
Arizona State Sun Devils football players
Atlanta Falcons players
Denver Broncos players
Indianapolis Colts players
New York Giants players
People from Highlands Ranch, Colorado
Players of American football from Colorado
Sportspeople from the Denver metropolitan area